Gregory NeVala Calvert (April 16, 1937 – August 12, 2005) was National Secretary of Students for a Democratic Society in 1966–67.

Biography

Early years
Gregory Calvert was born during the Great Depression, in a squatter's shack on the slopes of the Mount St. Helens volcano. As a boy, he lived with his Finnish grandparents on a small farm—Finnish was his first language. He was an excellent student, and eventually won a much-need Weyerhaeuser scholarship to Oregon State University. After graduation with a degree in history, a Woodrow Wilson fellowship enabled him to begin work toward a graduate degree in European History at Cornell University. He spent a year in Paris, then returned to the US in the fall of 1963, where he was offered and he accepted a teaching position as an instructor at Iowa State University in Ames, Iowa.

At Ames, he taught the very popular History of Western Civilization course and was the creative force behind, and the faculty advisor for, the alternative weekly student newspaper The Liberator. Greg was able to bring intellectuals of world renown to the campus to speak and read from their works, including Paul Goodman and Stephen Spender.

SDS involvement
In the fall of 1965, with about a dozen others, Greg started a local chapter at Iowa State University of the budding Students for a Democratic Society (SDS). He left that post with Jane Adams, the national secretary, in the spring of 1966. Greg was himself elected national secretary that summer at the 1966 convention at Clear Lake, Iowa. His election was part of the "prairie power" move of the organization away from the East Coast from where the organization had largely been controlled up to then. He played an important part in how the March on the Pentagon in 1967 unfolded—he prevented a suicidal charge by the demonstrators on the soldiers guarding the entrance of the Pentagon by persuading them to sit down instead. He was a pacifist who believed in non-violent methods of confrontation, and left SDS when it split into the Progressive Labor Party and Weatherman factions at the summer convention in 1969.

Later years
While living in Austin, Texas in the late 1960s and early 1970s, and as Students for a Democratic Society (SDS) was ending, Calvert inspired a range of ongoing new left educational projects. For instance, his brother Alex Calvert together with David MacBryde and others started The Armadillo Press. He then also went on to work for the Illinois State Drug Rehabilitation program in the early 1970s. Calvert encouraged people around, and occasionally wrote for, the alternative newspaper The Rag, published from 1966 to 1977.

Calvert had a lifelong interest in Buddhism, and set up a practice as a Buddhist psychotherapist in the late 1970s. He finished his doctoral studies at UC Santa Cruz in "History of Consciousness."  Calvert and Ken Carpenter, his partner from 1977 until his death, established an intensive Spanish language school, Casa Xalteva, in Granada, Nicaragua in 1995. He died of complications from diabetes and lung disease in Albuquerque, New Mexico in 2005.

Books by Gregory Calvert
Democracy from the Heart: Spiritual Values, Decentralism, and Democratic Idealism in the Movement of the 1960s Comunitas Press (1991) 
 A Disrupted History: The New Left and the New Capitalism  co-author Carol Neiman. Random House (1971)

References

 Sale, Kirkpatrick. SDS: Ten Years Towards a Revolution New York: Vintage Books (1974) .  It is available online: 
 Calvert, Greg Democracy from the Heart: Spiritual Values, Decentralism, and Democratic Idealism in the Movement of the 1960s

1937 births
2005 deaths
American political activists
Deaths from diabetes
People from Skamania County, Washington
American people of Finnish descent
Members of Students for a Democratic Society
Oregon State University alumni